Lubbe v Cape Plc [2000] UKHL 41 is a conflict of laws case, which is also highly significant for the question of lifting the corporate veil in relation to tort victims. In this case it was alleged, and postulated by the House of Lords, that in principle it is possible to show that a parent company owes a direct duty of care in tort to anybody injured by a subsidiary company in a group.

Facts
Mrs Lubbe was exposed to asbestos while working for a South African subsidiary company of the UK parent company, Cape plc. The South African subsidiary had no money left and Cape Plc had no assets in South Africa. Her case was one of 3000 claims. The case was initiated in the high court in London. After her death, Mr Lubbe continued the court action as her personal representative and the administrator of her estate. He alleged that the parent, Cape Plc, owed a direct duty of care in tort to him as a worker in the company group. Cape Plc was applying to stay the actions on the basis of forum non conveniens, submitting that they were an abuse of process on grounds that intention to launch a multi party action was not disclosed to the court. Mr Lubbe argued that the claims should not be stayed since, in South Africa, the legal aid necessary to continue the claim had been withdrawn, no contingency fee arrangement was available and no other source of funding would be available. The Court of Appeal refused Mr Lubbe's arguments and continued the stay, and Mr Lubbe appealed to the House of Lords.

Judgment
The House of Lords held unanimously that although South Africa was the more appropriate forum for hearing the claim, it was highly likely that legal representation for the claimants would be unavailable. The expert evidence suggested a denial of justice would result, exacerbated by the lack of procedures in South Africa to accommodate multi-party actions. This meant that lifting the stay was appropriate and the action continued in the English courts.

Lord Bingham made the following remark about the tort issue,

On a side issue, however, matters of public interest and policy were not relevant to determining which forum was best, and only private interests would be taken into account.

Significance
The dicta of Lord Bingham were applied for the first time in Chandler v Cape plc.

See also

UK company law
English tort law
Conflict of laws
Adams v Cape Industries plc
Donoghue v Stevenson

Notes

References

External links
Website of Cape plc

United Kingdom company case law
English tort case law
United Kingdom corporate personality case law
House of Lords cases
2000 in case law
2000 in British law